Antonio Delgado (15 December 1939 – 16 March 2022) was a Cape Verdean former footballer. He was nicknamed "Strømsgodset's Eusebio.” He was the first African to play with a Norwegian club and possibly the first Cape Verdean who played with a Scandinavian or a Northern European club.

He later moved to Norway and played with Strømsgodset Toppfotball. He debuted on 15 May 1967 in a match against Rosenborg BK and played seven matches with that club. Delgado scored another goal over FK Lyn on 25 May.

References

External links
 
 Antonio was the first man at NISO
 Player profile at Godset.no

1939 births
Living people
Cape Verdean footballers
Strømsgodset Toppfotball players
Cape Verdean expatriate footballers
Cape Verdean expatriate sportspeople in Norway
Expatriate footballers in Norway
Place of birth missing (living people)
Association footballers not categorized by position